Garn may refer to:

People 
Garn Stephens, American actress and writer for television, 1970s to 1990s
Jake Garn (born 1932), American politician from Utah, Navy officer and astronaut
Kevin Garn (born 1955), American politician from Utah
Stanley Marion Garn (1922–2007), American biologist and educator

Other uses 
Global Alliance for Rights of Nature; see 
GARN (company), U.S.-based alternative energy company
Garn scale, NASA's unit of measure for symptoms resulting from space adaptation syndrome, named after Jake Garn
Garn-yr-erw, village in Wales

See also 
 Le Garn
 Y Garn (disambiguation)